The Theban Tomb TT255 is located in Dra' Abu el-Naga'. It forms part of the Theban Necropolis, situated on the west bank of the Nile opposite Luxor. The sepulchre is the burial place of the ancient Egyptian Roy, who lived at the end of the 18th Dynasty, during the reign of Horemheb.

The tomb is small, consisting of only one chamber with a niche and burial shaft, but it is well decorated. The quality, detail and bright colours of its paintings, makes up for the tomb's diminutive size.

It is one of the two tombs in Dra' Abu el-Naga' that is open to the public. Roy was a "Royal Scribe in the Estates of Horemheb and of Amun," during Horemheb's reign. His wife, who appears with him in the tomb paintings, is named as Nebtawy, or 'Tawy' for short.

See also
 List of Theban tombs

References

External links

Buildings and structures of the Eighteenth Dynasty of Egypt
Theban tombs